Mutations is a compilation album released by the heavy metal band Fight in 1994. It features live recordings alongside studio remixes of songs from War of Words.

Track listing

Personnel 
Fight
 Rob Halford – vocals
 Brian Tilse – guitars
 Russ Parrish – guitars
 Jay Jay – bass
 Scott Travis – drums

Production
 Produced by Attie Bauw and Rob Halford
 Executive producer – John Baxter
 Recorded and mixed by Attie Bauw
Remastered by Andy Horn (2008 edition)
Art design – Marc Sasso

Fight (band) albums
1994 compilation albums
1994 live albums
1994 remix albums
Epic Records compilation albums
Epic Records remix albums
Epic Records live albums